Saccharopolyspora subtropica is a thermophilic bacterium from the genus Saccharopolyspora which has been isolated from a sugar cane field in Guangxi in China.

References

 

Pseudonocardineae
Bacteria described in 2016